Jog Meher Shrestha (August 1927 – 6 December 2009) was a well known Nepalese politician, belonging to the Rastriya Prajatantra Party and he was one of the founder members of RPP. He was politically active during the Panchayat period and served as minister of Home Affairs, Panchayat and Land Reforms, Health and Water Resources, Law and Justice, Education and Communication, Panchayat and Local Development and Land Reforms. Notably, Mr. Shrestha served as the Home Minister during the referudun which took place in May 1980. Mr. Shrestha was appointed Land Reform and Management Minister leading RPP in the coalition government led by Sher Bahadur Deuba in 2004.

After the royal takeover (coup d'etat) of Nepal by King Gyanendra on 1st February 2005, when democratically elected members of the country's coalition government led by the Nepali Congress were deposed by Gyanendra, King of Nepal and accused of misuse of the Prime Ministers Fund. In March 2005, he was released on bail. In June 2005, he was acquitted.

In 2006, Mr. Shrestha was acting chairman of the RPP.

Mr. Shrestha was admitted to hospital in Lalitpur on 2 December 2009 complaining of bladder pain; he passed away four days later on 6 December 2009, 9:00 am at the age of 82. Mr. Shrestha funeral took place on the same day at Pashupati Arya Ghat with state honours.

References

External links
2008 election interview

2009 deaths
Government ministers of Nepal
Rastriya Prajatantra Party politicians
Members of the Rastriya Panchayat